Tegina is a town in Rafi LGA, Niger State, Nigeria. Various Kainji languages are spoken in and around Tegina.

In 2021 a mass kidnapping of children by gunmen occurred at the end of May, at least 150 students went missing.

Villages 
Villages in Tegina:

Agwai, Ankawa, B. Gona, Bangu, Biito, D. Padama, Dada, G. Abashi, G. Angu, G. Barau, G. Danbiki, G. Dangama, G. Dangoru, G. Danjuma, G. Dijimakert, G. Jada, G. Katina, G. Kushama, G. Maiganga, G. Maikangara, G. Manzo, G. Tanko, G. Wakayi, G. Wani, G. Zubdomgi, Gende, Gini, Gisisi, Godora, Gulangi, Gunugu, Halatayi, Indaki, Inga, Inga Gari, Jambaka, Jiro, K. Madaka, Kagara, Kakuri, Katako, Kuru, Kwana, Luaga, Machinanugu, Madagwa, Mahanga, Natsina, Rubo, Rubu, Sabon Gari, Samboro, Sufawa, T. Ceshi, T. Duste, Tegina, Tunma, U. Alhaji, U. Uban-Dawaki, U. Butsi, Ugu, Ussa, Wayan, Yalwa

See also 
 Rafi, Nigeria
 Zungeru

References 

Populated places in Niger State